Mary Louisa Bruce, Countess of Elgin and Kincardine (8 May 1819 – 9 March 1898) was a British writer. She was vicereine of India in 1862-1863.

She was the daughter of John Lambton, 1st Earl of Durham and his second wife Louisa Elizabeth Lambton (née Grey), daughter of Charles Grey, 2nd Earl Grey.

She travelled to Canada twice: the first time when her father went to Canada to investigate the Lower Canada Rebellion in 29 May – 1 November 1838. She later returned to Canada with her husband, James Bruce, 8th Earl of Elgin, from 1847 to 1853.

An accomplished artist, she studied under John Richard Coke-Smyth, alongside her sister, Lady Emily Augusta, and travel companion, Katherine Ellice. She wrote and illustrated journals and diaries of her international travels.

References 

1819 births
1898 deaths
19th-century British women writers
19th-century British writers
19th-century Scottish women writers
British diarists
British women artists
Mary Louisa
Daughters of British earls
Mary Louisa
Scottish countesses
Women of the Victorian era
19th-century diarists
Viceregal consorts of India